The Florida Gators football program represents the University of Florida (UF) in American college football. Florida competes in the Football Bowl Subdivision (FBS) of the National Collegiate Athletic Association (NCAA) and the Eastern Division of the Southeastern Conference (SEC). They play their home games in Steve Spurrier-Florida Field at Ben Hill Griffin Stadium on the university's Gainesville campus.

Florida's football program was established along with the university in 1906, took on the "Gators" nickname in 1911, began playing in newly constructed Florida Field in 1930, and joined the Southeastern Conference as a founding member in 1932. On the field, the Gators found intermittent success during the first half of the 20th century, with a highlight being the 1928 squad that went 8–1 and led the nation in scoring. Florida football enjoyed its first sustained success in the 1960s under head coach Ray Graves. After having appeared in only two sanctioned bowl games up to that time, Grave's Gators won four during the decade, and quarterback Steve Spurrier became the school's first Heisman Trophy winner in 1966.

Spurrier returned to his alma mater as the Gators' head ball coach in 1990, and the program has been among the top in college football since then. Since 1990, Florida has won three national championships (in 1996 under Spurrier and in 2006 and 2008 under Urban Meyer), eight conference titles, fifteen SEC East division titles, and sixteen bowl games, and Florida squads have finished the season ranked in the top-10 fifteen times. In addition, quarterbacks Danny Wuerffel and Tim Tebow won the Heisman in 1996 and 2007, respectively.

History 

The University of Florida was established in Gainesville in 1906 and fielded its first official varsity football team that fall. Since then, Florida Gator football squads have played in over 40 bowl games; won three national championships (1996, 2006 and 2008) and eight Southeastern Conference championships (1991, 1993, 1994, 1995, 1996, 2000, 2006 and 2008) and have produced three Heisman Trophy winners, over 90 first-team All-Americans and 50 National Football League (NFL) first-round draft choices.

Counting interim coaches, there have been twenty-nine head coaches in program history, including three who were inducted into the College Football Hall of Fame for their coaching success. Florida's first head coach was Pee Wee Forsythe, and the current coach is Billy Napier.

Florida competed for its first several seasons as an independent before joining the Southern Intercollegiate Athletic Association in 1912. They moved to the Southern Conference in 1922, then joined with a dozen other schools to establish the Southeastern Conference (SEC) in 1932. Florida is one of fourteen member institutions in the SEC, and the football team has competed in the SEC Eastern Division since the league began divisional play in 1992.

Florida plays an eight-game SEC schedule, with six games against the other Eastern Division teams: Georgia, South Carolina, Tennessee, Kentucky, Missouri and Vanderbilt. The schedule is filled out with an annual game against Louisiana State and a rotating SEC Western Division team. Until 2003, the Gators also played Auburn every season, but contests in the rivalry are now infrequent events as part of the SEC's rotating opponent system.

Key conference rivalries include the annual Florida–Georgia game in Jacksonville, Florida (usually around Halloween), the Florida–Tennessee rivalry (usually mid-September), and the inter-divisional Florida–LSU rivalry with their permanent SEC Western Division foe (usually in October).

Florida has played in-state rival Florida State every year since 1958 except for the pandemic-altered 2020 season. The Gators and Seminoles have faced off in the last game of the regular season since the 1970s, and their emergence as perennial football powers during the 1990s helped build the Florida–Florida State rivalry into a game that often had national-title implications. In-state rival Miami was once another annual opponent. However, the rivalry was dropped when the SEC expanded its yearly schedule in the late 1980s, and the Florida–Miami rivalry has been renewed on an infrequent basis since then. The remaining dates on Florida's regular schedule are filled by non-conference opponents which vary from year to year.

Home fields

UF's campus did not initially include sports facilities, so the school's first football and baseball squads played their early home games at The Ballpark, the city's municipal park near downtown Gainesville. In 1911, the university installed bleachers alongside a grassy area on the north edge of the campus and dubbed it University Athletic Field, which was expanded and renamed Fleming Field in 1915.

The football program found its initial national recognition in the late 1920s and moved into a modern stadium in 1930 with 22,000 seat Florida Field, which was built just south of Fleming Field. In 1989, the name was extended to "Florida Field at Ben Hill Griffin Stadium" to honor alumnus and sports benefactor Ben Hill Griffin. In 2016, former player and coach Steve Spurrier was honored by having his name added to the name of the field; it is now officially known as "Steve Spurrier-Florida Field at Ben Hill Griffin Stadium". The facility is also commonly known as "The Swamp", a nickname that Spurrier coined in 1992, when he was Florida's head ball coach. Florida Field has been renovated and expanded many times over the decades and has a capacity of almost 90,000.

Even after Florida Field was constructed, Florida occasionally scheduled "home" game in other cities across the state, most often Tampa or Jacksonville. This practice was common in the early years of the program, when the Gators' home field was smaller and traveling to Gainesville was more difficult. The frequency of these rotating home games had decreased from one or two contests per season in the 1930s to one every few seasons by the 1980s. With the exception of the traditional rivalry game against Georgia, the Gators have not scheduled any home games outside of Gainesville since Florida Field expanded to become the largest football stadium in the state in 1990.

Conference affiliations 
Florida's football program is a charter member of the Southeastern Conference, which began play in 1933. Before that, the Gators were affiliated with two different conferences after having founded the program without a conference affiliation.

 Independent (1906–1911) 
 Southern Intercollegiate Athletic Association (1912–1921) 
 Southern Conference (1922–1932)
 Southeastern Conference (1933–present)

Championships

National championships

The Florida Gators have been named national champions five times by NCAA-designated major selectors.

Claimed national championships

Florida claims three national championships, for the 1996, 2006 and 2008 seasons. At the end of each season the Gators were ranked No. 1 in both the final AP and Coaches polls and were recognized as consensus national champions after winning a designated national championship bowl game.

Unclaimed national championships

Florida has been named national champion by NCAA-designated "major selectors" in two additional years, 1984 and 1985. Partially because the football program was on NCAA probation in the mid-1980s, the university has never claimed a share of the national championship for either season.

Conference championships 

Florida has won a total of eight SEC championships. The Gators won their first championship with a conference record of 5–0–1 in 1984, but the title was vacated several months after the season ended by the SEC university presidents because of NCAA infractions by the Florida coaching staff under Charley Pell. The 1985 and 1990 teams also finished atop the standings with conference records of 5–1 and 6–1, respectively, but Florida was ineligible for the championship due to its NCAA probation for rule violations by previous coaching staffs.  The Gators won their first official SEC football championship in 1991.

Division championships 

With the addition of Arkansas and South Carolina to the Southeastern Conference in 1992, the conference split into eastern and western divisions and a game between the division winners determined the SEC champion. Florida has made thirteen appearances in the SEC Championship Game (the most by any SEC school), most recently in 2020. The Gators have a 7–6 record all-time in SEC Championship Games as of 2020.

† In 1992, Florida finished the season tied with Georgia for the SEC East; however, Florida had defeated Georgia and won the tie-breaker to represent the division in the 1992 SEC Championship Game. In 2003 Florida ended the regular season in a three-way tie for the SEC East title with Georgia and Tennessee, and the tie-breaking procedure selected Georgia to advance to the 2003 SEC Championship Game due to having the highest BCS ranking (after the higher-priority tiebreakers failed to break the tie). In 2012 the Gators were tied with Georgia, however, Georgia had defeated Florida and won the tie-breaker to represent the division in the 2012 SEC Championship Game.

Coaching staff

Head Coaches

Bowl games 

Florida has appeared in 48 NCAA-sanctioned bowl games, garnering a 24–24 record. This includes a streak of 22 consecutive bowl-game appearances from 1991 through 2012, the fifth-longest in college football history. Four of their bowl games were for a National Championship, with two under the Bowl Alliance and two in the Bowl Championship Series. Florida is 3–1 in national championship games.

† The 1912 Bacardi Bowl held in Havana, Cuba was not sanctioned by the NCAA and was intended to be one half of a two-game event which was not completed due to a dispute over the rules of the game. As such, the University of Florida Athletic Association does not include the contest in the Gators' official bowl record.
‡ Coalition, Alliance, BCS or New Year's Six Bowl game.

Records against SEC and in-state opponents

Florida's season records are from the record books of the university's athletic association.  Through the end of the 2019 season, Florida has compiled an overall record of 729 wins, 437 losses, and 37 ties (including post-season bowl games).

All-time record against current SEC teams 

Florida plays SEC East opponents Kentucky, Tennessee, Vanderbilt, Missouri, Georgia, and South Carolina along with SEC West foe LSU on an annual basis. The other SEC West teams are played on a six-year rotation, with the added possibility of meeting in the SEC Championship Game.

All-time record against in-state opponents 
The University of Florida's athletic program operated with a limited budget for the first several years after its establishment in 1906. To reduce travel costs, early Florida football teams played limited slates of games, mostly against squads from nearby schools. Local scheduling resulted in the development of gridiron rivalries with several in-state private colleges, most notably Stetson, Florida Southern, and Rollins. Of those early opponents, Florida Southern and Rollins no longer sponsor intercollegiate football programs and, after dropping the sport for half a century, the Stetson Hatters compete in a lower division of college football. Florida also scheduled occasional games against teams organized by local athletic clubs or nearby military bases during the first half of the 20th century, particularly during the two world wars. However, the Gators have not played a non-collegiate squad since 1945.

In more modern times, Florida began an annual rivalry with the University of Miami Hurricanes in 1938 that continued uninterrupted until 1987. The teams have met on an occasional basis since then and are still considered rivals. Florida State (FSU) established a football program in 1947 and first faced Florida in 1958, beginning a series that was uninterrupted until the COVID-19 pandemic in 2020 resulted in both schools playing conference-only schedules. The Gators have also scheduled occasional contests against several Florida schools with newer football programs, usually in Gainesville.

All records accurate as of the conclusion of the 2021 season

Rivalries

Georgia

Historically, Georgia has been Florida's most hated and fierce rival. Previously known as "The World's Largest Outdoor Cocktail Party," and now most commonly called the "Florida–Georgia game" by Gator fans, this rivalry often decides the SEC East and has national implications. The game is held at TIAA Bank Field in Jacksonville, Florida, usually on the last Saturday in October or the first Saturday in November. The designated "home" team alternates, with ticket distribution split evenly between the schools. Since 2009, the Okefenokee Oar has been awarded to the winner of the Florida-Georgia game.

In the rivalry's early years, games rotated among locations in Savannah, Tampa, Jacksonville and, occasionally, Gainesville and Athens. Since 1933 the game has been played in Jacksonville, except for 1994 and 1995 (when the teams played a pair of home-and-home games at their respective stadiums). Georgia had early success in the rivalry, winning the first six games and holding a 21–5–1 series lead before 1950. After the 2018 game Florida has won 21 out of the most-recent 29 games, and holds a 38–30–1 advantage in the series since 1950. Georgia lead the series overall 53–44–2 through the 2021 season.

Tennessee

Although Florida and Tennessee are charter members of the SEC, irregular conference scheduling resulted in the teams meeting infrequently for many years. Tennessee won the first ten games between 1916 and 1954, when Florida finally defeated the Volunteers.  In 1969, Florida hired Tennessee head coach (and former Florida quarterback) Doug Dickey to replace the retiring Ray Graves immediately after their teams met in the Gator Bowl.

The rivalry reached a peak during the 1990s. In 1992, the SEC expanded to twelve schools and split into two divisions. Florida and Tennessee (in the Eastern Division) have met every year since, usually in mid-September for both teams' first conference game of the season. Led by coaches Steve Spurrier and Phillip Fulmer and featuring players such as Danny Wuerffel and Peyton Manning, both teams were regularly ranked in the top 10 when they met, giving the rivalry conference and national title implications. Florida and Tennessee combined to win six SEC titles and two national championships during the 1990s.

Since becoming annual opponents in 1992, the Gators and Volunteers have combined to represent the Eastern Division in the SEC Championship Game 16 times. Florida had an 11-game winning streak against Tennessee (2005–2015) and leads the series 31–20 following the 2021 season.

Florida State 

The University of Florida and the Florida State College for Women became co-educational in 1947. The new Florida State Seminoles football team began playing small colleges, moving up to the major-college ranks in 1955. Almost immediately, Florida State students and supporters called for the teams of Florida's two largest universities to play each other annually.

Contrary to popular belief, Florida's state legislature did not decree that Florida and Florida State should meet on the field; a bill mandating the game was rejected by the Florida Senate. Prodding by Florida governor LeRoy Collins facilitated an agreement between the two universities to begin an annual series in 1958. Due to Florida State's smaller stadium, the first six games were played at Florida Field. The series has alternated between the campuses since 1964, when Doak Campbell Stadium in Tallahassee was expanded. The Florida–Florida State game has had national-championship implications since 1990, and both teams have entered the game with top-10 rankings thirteen times. Among these was the Sugar Bowl rematch at the end of the 1996 season, when Florida avenged its only regular-season loss and won its first national championship 52–20.

Florida dominated the early series with a 16–2–1 record through 1976. Both teams have produced significant winning streaks, and the series is nearly tied over the past four decades; Florida State holds a 21–20–1 advantage since 1980. Since 2000, the teams share 10-10 records against one another. Florida leads the all-time series 37–26–2 through the 2021 season.

LSU 

Florida and LSU first met on the football field in 1937, and have been annual opponents since 1971. Since 1992, LSU has been Florida's permanent inter-divisional rival from the SEC Western Division. The winner of the Florida–LSU game went on to win the Bowl Championship Series (BCS) national championship game in the 2006, 2007, 2008, and 2019 seasons. This rivalry has been known recently for close games, with both teams highly ranked. Florida leads the all-time series 33–32–3 through the 2021 season.

Auburn 

Auburn and Florida played annually from 1945 to 2002. In the overall series won-lost record, Auburn is Florida's most evenly-matched SEC opponent. Beginning in the 1980s, one team was usually highly ranked coming into the game and it had conference- and national-title implications. The series has had several notable upsets. Auburn defeated previously-unbeaten Florida teams in 1993, 1994, 2001, 2006 and 2007, although the Gators won SEC championships in 1993, 1994 and 2006.

The annual series ended in 2002, when the SEC adjusted its football schedules so each team played one permanent and two rotating opponents from the opposite SEC division every year (instead of one rotating and two permanent teams). When Texas A&M and Missouri joined the conference in 2012, the schedule was changed again; each team played one permanent and one rotating opponent from the opposite division every year. LSU was designated as Florida's annual SEC Western Division opponent, and Florida and Auburn play two regular-season games every 12 years. Auburn leads the series 43–39–2 through the 2021 season.

Miami 

Miami is Florida's only pre-World War II in-state rival that still plays major college football. The schools first met on the gridiron in 1938 and again every season until 1987, when the SEC's expansion of its conference schedule to seven games precluded the annual matchup. A contract to renew the annual rivalry in the 1990s fell through when the SEC expanded its schedule again to eight games, and the Florida and Miami did not play again until the 2001 Sugar Bowl. The home and home series briefly resumed in 2002 and 2003, and they played again in the 2004 Peach Bowl. Since then, the schools have played intermittently during the regular season, with home and home series split across several years.

Miami leads the series 29–27 through the 2021 season.
The next scheduled matchup between the schools will be in Gainesville on August 31, 2024.

Alabama 

Although the series started in 1916, many consider the rivalry between Florida and Alabama to have started in 1992, with the advent of the SEC Championship Game. Florida has appeared in 13 of the 30 conference championship games with Alabama appearing in 14. 10 of those matches were against each other, the most common matchup so far. Alabama leads the conference championship match-up 6–4, following the most recent match-up between both programs, the 2020 SEC Championship Game, which saw Alabama beat Florida 52–46.

Alabama leads the series 27–14 since the end of the 2021 season.

Individual award winners

Heisman Trophy
Steve Spurrier (1966)
Danny Wuerffel (1996)
Tim Tebow (2007)
Maxwell Award
Danny Wuerffel (1996)
Tim Tebow (2007, 2008)
Walter Camp Award
Danny Wuerffel (1996)
Sammy Baugh Trophy
John Reaves (1971)
Danny Wuerffel (1995)
Davey O'Brien Award
Danny Wuerffel (1995, 1996)
Tim Tebow (2007)
Rimington Trophy
Maurkice Pouncey (2009)
Ray Guy Award
Chas Henry (2010)
Jim Thorpe Award
Lawrence Wright (1996)

Johnny Unitas Golden Arm Award
Danny Wuerffel (1996)
Chic Harley Award
Steve Spurrier (1966)
Tim Tebow (2007)
Lou Groza Award
Judd Davis (1993)
John Mackey Award
Aaron Hernandez (2009)
Kyle Pitts (2020)
Draddy Trophy
Brad Culpepper (1991)
Danny Wuerffel (1996)
Tim Tebow (2009)
Wuerffel Trophy
Tim Tebow (2008)
Manning Award
Tim Tebow (2008)
Rhodes Scholarship
William McRae (1933)
Bill Kynes (1977)

College Football Hall of Fame members 

Thirteen people associated with Florida have been inducted into the College Football Hall of Fame, four as head coaches and ten as players.

Steve Spurrier was inducted into the Hall of Fame in 1986 for his record as Florida's Heisman Trophy-winning quarterback from 1964 to 1966 and again in 2017 for his head coaching achievements at Duke, Florida, and South Carolina. He is one of four members of the College Football Hall of Fame inducted as both a player and a coach.
Doug Dickey, Florida's quarterback in 1951 and 1952, was inducted into the Hall of Fame in 2003 for his record as head coach of the Tennessee Volunteers from 1964 to 1969 and the Gators from 1970 to 1978.
Marcelino Huerta, a standout Gator lineman from 1947 to 1949, was inducted in 2002 for his record as head coach of the Tampa Spartans, Wichita State Shockers and Parson Wildcats.

All-Americans 

Since Florida's first season in 1906, 89 players have received one or more selections as first-team All-Americans. This includes 32 consensus All-Americans, of which six were unanimous.  The first Florida first-team All-American was end Dale Van Sickel, a member of the 1928 team. Florida's first consensus All-American was quarterback Steve Spurrier, the winner of the Heisman Trophy for the 1966 Gators.

SEC Legends 

Since 1994, the Southeastern Conference has annually designated one former football player from each SEC member school as an "SEC Legend."  Through 2017, the following Gators have been named SEC Legends:

 Carlos Alvarez
 Jack Youngblood
 Kerwin Bell
 John Reaves
 Neal Anderson
 Nat Moore
 Glenn Cameron
 Huey Richardson
 Brad Culpepper
 Larry Smith
 Lomas Brown
 Trace Armstrong
 Louis Oliver
 Ralph Ortega
 Reidel Anthony
 Errict Rhett
 Kevin Carter
 Ike Hilliard
 Steve Tannen
 Wes Chandler
 Lito Sheppard
 Fred Taylor
 Steve Spurrier
 Danny Wuerffel

Fergie Ferguson Award 

The Fergie Ferguson Award is given in memory of one of the University of Florida's finest athletes, Forest K. Ferguson. Ferguson was an All-SEC end for Florida in 1941 and state boxing champion in 1942. Subsequently, a second lieutenant in the U.S. Army, he led an infantry platoon during the D-Day landings in Normandy on June 6, 1944. Ferguson helped clear the way for his troops to advance on the Axis position, and was severely wounded leading his men in the assault. A recipient of the Distinguished Service Cross for his actions, he died from war-related injuries in 1954. The award, a trophy, is given to the senior football player who most displays "leadership, character, and courage."

Ring of Honor 
The University of Florida Athletic Association established the Florida Football Ring of Honor in 2006 to recognize the program's greatest players and coaches during the 100th year of Gator football. (The Gators do not have any retired jersey numbers. Although Steve Spurrier's (11) and Scot Brantley's (55) numbers were retired in the 1970s, Spurrier reissued them when he was Florida's head coach, and numbers worn by all members of the Ring of Honor are available for use by current players.)

Originally, members of the Ring of Honor had their jersey painted on the endzone facade at Ben Hill Griffin Stadium. When expanded video screens were installed in that location a few years later, inductees were each recognized with an 18-foot wide sign perched atop the north endzone grandstand. Five honorees were inducted in 2006 and 2007, with Tim Tebow added in 2018. To date, the only person who meets the Ring of Honor criteria and has not yet been inducted is two-time national championship winning former head coach Urban Meyer.

To be considered for induction into the Ring of Honor, a former player or coach must be absent from the university for five seasons, be in good standing, and meet at least one of the following criteria:

 Heisman Trophy winner (Spurrier, Wuerffel, Tebow)
 Former All-Americans inducted into the Pro Football Hall of Fame as players (Smith, Youngblood)
 Former All-Americans who are NFL career category leaders (Smith)
 College-career category leaders (Tebow)
 Coaches with one or more national championship (Spurrier)
 Coaches with three or more SEC championships (Spurrier)
 Players with two or more consensus All-America honors who were also named national offensive or defensive player of the year (Marshall, Tebow)

All-Time teams 
A Florida Football All-Time Team was compiled by the Florida Alumnus, the official publication of the Florida alumni, in 1927.

First team
QB – Rammy Ramsdell
HB – Dummy Taylor
HB – Ed Jones
FB – Bill Middlekauff
E – Ferdinand H. Duncan
T – Cy Williams
G – Goldy Goldstein
C – Bo Gator Storter
G – Tootie Perry
T – Jim Coarsy
E – Joe Swanson
 
Second team
QB – Bob Shackleford
HB – Ark Newton
HB – Harvey Hester
FB – Ray Dickson
E – G. P. Wood
T – Pus Hancock
G – Arthur Doty
C – Lamar Sarra
G – Ed Meisch
T – Robbie Robinson
E – Frank Oosterhoudt

Another University of Florida all-time team was chosen by the Miami Herald according to a fan vote in August 1983.

First Team Offense
QB – Steve Spurrier
RB – Larry Smith
RB – Nat Moore
WR – Cris Collinsworth
WR – Wes Chandler
TE – Jim Yarbrough
OT – Randy Jackson
OT – Mike Williams
OG – Burton Lawless
OG – Guy Dennis
C – Bill Carr
PK – David Posey

First Team Defense
DL – Jack Youngblood
DL – Scott Hutchinson
DL – David Galloway
DL – Charlie LaPradd
LB – Ralph Ortega
LB – Scot Brantley
LB – Wilber Marshall
LB – Glenn Cameron
DB – Steve Tannen
DB – Jackie Simpson
DB – Bernie Parrish
P – Bobby Joe Green

Second Team Offense
QB – John Reaves
RB – Rick Casares
RB – James Jones
WR – Carlos Alvarez
WR – Charles Casey
TE – Chris Faulkner
OT – Mac Steen
OT – Charlie Mitchell
OG – Larry Beckman
OG – John Barrow
C – Steve DeLaTorre
PK – Brian Clark

Second Team Defense
DL – Robin Fisher
DL – Joe D'Agostino
DL – Lynn Matthews
DL – Vel Heckman
LB – David Little
LB – Fred Abbott
LB – Sammy Green
DB – Bruce Bennett
DB – Tony Lilly
DB – Hagood Clarke
P – Don Chandler

All-Century Team 

The Florida Football All-Century Team, chosen by Gator fans, was compiled by The Gainesville Sun in the fall of 1999.

First Team Offense
QB – Danny Wuerffel (1993–96)
RB – Neal Anderson (1982–85)
RB – Emmitt Smith (1987–89)
WR – Carlos Alvarez (1969–71)
WR – Wes Chandler (1974–77)
TE – Jim Yarbrough (1966–68)
OT – Lomas Brown (1981–84)
OT – David Williams (1985–88)
OG – Burton Lawless (1972–74)
OG – Donnie Young (1993–96)
OC – Jeff Mitchell (1993–96)
PK – Judd Davis (1992–94)
KR – Jacquez Green (1995–97)

First Team Defense
DE – Jack Youngblood (1968–70)
DE – Kevin Carter (1991–94)
DT – Brad Culpepper (1988–91)
DT – Ellis Johnson (1991–94)
LB – Wilber Marshall (1980–83)
LB – Scot Brantley (1976–79)
LB – David Little (1977–80)
CB – Steve Tannen (1967–69)
CB – Jarvis Williams (1984–87)
S – Louis Oliver (1985–88)
S – Bruce Bennett (1963–65)
P – Bobby Joe Green (1958–59)

Second Team Offense
QB – Steve Spurrier (1964–66)
RB – Rick Casares (1951–53)
RB – James Jones (1979–82)
WR – Reidel Anthony (1994–96)
WR – Ike Hilliard (1994–96)
TE – Kirk Kirkpatrick (1987–90)
OT – Jason Odom (1992–95)
OT – Mike Williams (1973–75)
OG – Larry Gagner (1963–65)
OG – Jeff Zimmerman (1983–86)
OC – Phil Bromley (1981–84)
PK – David Posey (1973–76)
KR – Jack Jackson (1992–94)

Second Team Defense
DE – David Ghesquiere (1967–69)
DE – Lynn Matthews (1963–65)
DT – David Galloway (1979–81)
DT – Charlie LaPradd (1950–52)
LB – Sammy Green (1972–75)
LB – Alonzo Johnson (1983–85)
LB – Ralph Ortega (1972–74)
CB – Fred Weary (1994–97)
CB – Richard Fain (1987–90)
S – Tony Lilly (1980–83)
S – Wayne Fields (1972–75)
P – Ray Criswell (1982–85)

100th-Anniversary Team 

The 100th-Anniversary Florida Team was selected in 2006 to celebrate a century of Florida football. Fans voted by mail and online.

Offense
QB – Danny Wuerffel (1993–1996)
RB – Errict Rhett (1990–1993)
RB – Emmitt Smith (1987–1989)
RB – Fred Taylor (1994–1997)
WR – Carlos Alvarez (1969–1971)
WR – Cris Collinsworth (1977–1980)
WR – Chris Doering (1992–1995)
WR – Ike Hilliard (1994–1996)
OL – Lomas Brown (1981–1984)
OL – Mike Degory (2002–2005)
OL – Jeff Mitchell (1993–1996)
OL – Jason Odom (1992–1995)
PK – Jeff Chandler (1998–2001)

Defense
DL – Trace Armstrong (1988)
DL – Alex Brown (1998–2001)
DL – Kevin Carter (1991–1994)
DL – Brad Culpepper (1988–1991)
DL – Jack Youngblood (1968–1970)
LB – Scot Brantley (1976–1979)
LB – Channing Crowder (2003–2004)
LB – Jevon Kearse (1996–1998)
LB – Wilber Marshall (1980–1983)
DB – Louis Oliver (1985–1988)
DB – Lito Sheppard (1999–2001)
DB – Fred Weary (1994–1997)
P – Shayne Edge (1991–1994)

Uniforms 

The Florida football team has worn a home uniform of blue jerseys (usually a variation of royal blue) with white pants for most of the program's history. The most notable exception was a decade-long period from 1979 until 1989, when at the suggestion of coach Charlie Pell, the Gators switched to orange home jerseys. For road games, Florida wears white jerseys with blue, orange, or white pants, depending on the colors of the opponent or the choice of the players that week.

Steve Spurrier restored the home blue jerseys when he became the Gators' head ball coach in 1990. From 1990 until 2014, Florida's primary home uniforms were blue jerseys with white pants, with blue pants an option for high-profile games, especially at night. Former coach Jim McElwain usually allowed his senior players to decide which uniform combination the team wore for each game. Since this practice began during the 2015 season, the Gators have worn many different combinations of blue or orange jerseys along with blue, orange, or white pants.

Florida has occasionally worn alternative uniforms, which are usually similar to current or former uniforms and used an orange and blue color scheme. One exception were the "swamp green" uniforms used at a home game against Texas A&M in October 2017. These used a dark green theme for the entire uniform from shoes to helmet that was inspired by the appearance of actual alligators. The uniform marked the 25th anniversary of former coach Steve Spurrier introducing the Swamp nickname for Florida Field.

Helmets
Florida has had a number of helmet designs, especially early in the program's history. Since the end of the leather helmet era, base colors have alternated between orange, white, and (occasionally) blue, and logos have included the “Gators” script font, an interlocking "UF", a simple "F", and the player number.

From 1979 until 2006, Florida wore orange helmets with a script "Gators" logo in all contests. To commemorate the 100th year of the football program in 2006, the Gators played one game wearing throwback uniforms modeled after their mid-1960s uniforms which included white helmets with a simple "F" logo. In 2009 the Gators participated in Nike's Pro Combat uniform campaign, wearing specially-designed blue uniforms and white helmets with a slant-F logo. These uniforms were worn for the last regular-season game against Florida State, and the white helmets were worn again the following week against Alabama in the SEC Championship Game with white jerseys and pants. Florida introduced a different white alternative helmet in 2015 which featured the script "Gators" logo on one side and the slant-F logo on the other, and in 2018 replaced the slant-F with script "Gators" on both sides. In 2017, the Gators wore "swamp green" helmets for one game. These dark green helmets featured a color-altered Gator head logo on one side and the player's number in orange on the other.

For the 2019 homecoming game versus Auburn, Florida wore the same mid-1960s throwback uniforms, including the white helmets with the blue "F" logo within an orange circular outline. The Gators wore the blue helmets for two games in 2020: the tweaked 1960s version with the orange "F" logo within an orange circular outline for their home game against Missouri, and the traditional version with the "Gators" script in orange font for their road game at Tennessee. The team wore the 1960s throwback uniforms again for their 2021 homecoming game versus Vanderbilt, but with orange helmets including the interlocking "UF" logo.

To commemorate the 20th anniversary of the September 11 attacks, the Gators wore white helmets with the red, white, and blue American flag styled "Gators" script for their 2021 road contest at the University of South Florida.

Team logos

Future opponents 
Note: With the impending expansion of the SEC to a 16-member conference with the additions of Texas and Oklahoma, the league's current scheduling arrangements are in the process of being revamped. The information below should be accurate through the 2023 season, after which Florida's conference and non-conference schedules will have to be adjusted.

Annual SEC East opponents 
Florida has played each of the other members of the SEC Eastern Division every year since the SEC expanded to an eight-game league schedule in 1992. Florida's annual conference opponents are Kentucky, Tennessee, Vanderbilt, Georgia, Missouri, and South Carolina, usually scheduled in that order. Most of the Gators' SEC East opponents are played on a home-and-home basis, with Tennessee and Vanderbilt visiting Gainesville in odd numbered years and Kentucky, South Carolina, and Missouri visiting in even numbered years. The Florida–Georgia game is played annually in Jacksonville.

SEC West opponents 
In addition to six games against eastern division opponents, Florida plays two games against western division opponents. Florida's permanent non-division opponent is Louisiana State (LSU), whom the Gators play annually. The other six SEC Western Division teams rotate on a six-year cycle, with the Florida playing every western division team once every six years (twice every 12 years) with alternating home and away games.

The winners of the east and west divisions meet in the SEC Championship Game, potentially creating a rematch of a regular season contest. Florida has played in 12 SEC Championship Games and have been involved in two rematches –  1999, when they lost to Alabama in the regular season and lost again in the SEC championship, and 2000, when they beat Auburn during the regular season and defeated them again to win the conference title.

Non-conference opponents 
Florida has played a continuous series against in-state rival Florida State (FSU) since 1958. While the eight game SEC slate plus the annual matchup with FSU are set years in advance, the schedule allows for two or three additional non-conference games against various opponents that are usually played in Gainesville for revenue purposes. In recent years, Florida has been also invited to participate in several season opening non-conference neutral-site games which do not count against the NCAA cap on regular season games.

Announced opponents and dates are as of September 5, 2022.

Texas, along with fellow Big 12 rival Oklahoma, are slated to join the SEC, with 2025 being the target year.

See also 

 List of University of Florida Athletic Hall of Fame members
 University Athletic Association

Notes

References

Further reading 
 2015 Florida Gators Football Media Guide, University Athletic Association, Gainesville, Florida (2015).
 
 

 

 
 
 
 Nash, Noel, ed., The Gainesville Sun Presents The Greatest Moments in Florida Gators Football, Sports Publishing, Inc., Champaign, Illinois (1998).  .

 Proctor, Samuel, & Wright Langley, Gator History: A Pictorial History of the University of Florida, South Star Publishing Company, Gainesville, Florida (1986).  .

External links 

 

 
American football teams established in 1906
1906 establishments in Florida